= Thakkadi =

Sri Lankan rice balls cooked in gravy

- Course: main course
- Place of origin: Sri Lanka
- Region or state: Sri Lanka
- Serving temperature: hot (temperature)
- Main ingredients: Rice flour, Mutton
- Variations: Beef, Chicken

Thakkadi (தக்கடி) is a Sri Lankan food. The dish consists of rice balls or dumplings covered in a sauce and cooked in a mutton salna, (a spicy gravy). Thakkadi originated from the Moor community in Sri Lanka.

== Overview ==
Thakkadi is made from steamed rice flour balls cooked in a mutton salna. The balls are made of rice flour, finely sliced shallots, chopped curry leaves and shredded coconut. They are then cooked in a spicy meat (either mutton or beef or even chicken) stew or dipped in spiced curry.
